Rainham railway station is on the Chatham Main Line in South East England, serving the town of Rainham, Kent.

The station and most trains that call are operated by Southeastern. Following a timetable change on Sunday 20 May 2018, some trains are operated by Govia Thameslink. The station has three platforms. Platform 0 is an "up" bay platform, used mainly by Thameslink Services. Platform 1 is an "up" through providing services towards London, and Platform 2 is a "down" through for services towards Ramsgate and Dover Priory.

It is sometimes shown as Rainham (Kent) in order to distinguish it from the station of the same name in East London.

There are accessible entrances without stairs on both platforms, with step-free access via Platform 1 for services towards London (via main station entrance). Step-free access via Platform 2 for services away from London (via side entrance, short ramp from Granary Close). To interchange platforms, people needing accessible access must use the road and steep paths in excess of 250 metres. (There is also a steep staircase overpass over the tracks to interchange platforms.)

Induction loops are available and ticket counters are able to be lowered or raised. There are also accessible ticket machines in the station forecourt. There are fold-away ramps available on platforms for wheelchair train access.

Services
Services at Rainham are operated by Southeastern and Thameslink using ,  and  EMUs.

The typical off-peak service in trains per hour is:

 1 tph to London St Pancras International
 2 tph to  
 2 tph to  via  and 
 1 tph to  via 
 2 tph to 

Thameslink Programme
In connection with the rebuild of Rochester Station, a new bay platform has been added on the south side (facing towards London).
Trains are now able to use this new platform as the East Kent Resignalling Project has been completed. Initially, only a couple of trains used it in the evening rush hour, but since May 2018, Thameslink trains are now starting from here to Luton, via Gravesend, Dartford and Greenwich. This replaces the Gillingham to Charing Cross services, meaning passengers will have to change at Dartford or London Bridge for Charing Cross or Cannon Street.

References

External links

Rainham Station Photos Through the Years
Southeastern Railway - Rainham Station

Railway stations in Medway
DfT Category C2 stations
Former London, Chatham and Dover Railway stations
Railway stations in Great Britain opened in 1858
Railway stations served by Southeastern
Railway stations served by Govia Thameslink Railway